Polyaspididae is a family of mites in the order Mesostigmata.

Species
 Calotrachys Berlese, 1916
 Calotrachys fimbriatipes (Michael, 1908)
 Dipolyaspis Berlese, 1916
 Dipolyaspis sansonei (Berlese, 1916)
 Dyscritaspis Camin, 1953
 Dyscritaspis whartoni Camin, 1953
 Polyaspis Berlese, 1881
 Polyaspis australis Berlese, 1910
 Polyaspis athiasae Hirschmann & Ztrngiebl-Nicol, 1969
 Polyaspis bengalensis (Pramanik & Raychaudhuri, 1978)
 Polyaspis berlesei Camin, 1954
 Polyaspis bincheae Wisniewski & Hirschmann, 1984
 Polyaspis calcuttaensis Sarkar & Sanyal, 1999
 Polyaspis criocephali Wisniewski, 1980
 Polyaspis flechtmanni Hirschmann & Kemnitzer, 1989
 Polyaspis lamellipes Banks, 1914
 Polyaspis nicolae Wisniewski & Hirschmann, 1984
 Polyaspis patavinus Berlese, 1881
 Polyaspis posnaniensis Wisniewski & Hirschmann, 1991
 Polyaspis potchefstroomi Ryke, 1956
 Polyaspis repandus Berlese, 1904
 Polyaspis vitzthumi Hirschmann & Zirngiebl-Nicol, 1969
 Polyaspis sclerophyllus (Michael, 1908)

References

Mesostigmata
Acari families